Maxair was an airline based at Malmö in Sweden. It was formed as an air-taxi operation in 1996, and started scheduled operations in September 1998. It operated two Fairchild Metroliners
and two Jetstream 32s. The airline ceased operations in 2005.

See also
 Airlines
 Transport in Sweden

References

Defunct airlines of Sweden
Airlines established in 1996
Airlines disestablished in 2005